Bernhard Radtke (born 26 April 1949) is a German weightlifter. He competed in the men's light heavyweight event at the 1972 Summer Olympics.

References

External links
 

1949 births
Living people
German male weightlifters
Olympic weightlifters of East Germany
Weightlifters at the 1972 Summer Olympics
Sportspeople from Erfurt